Robert O'Gorman is an Australian rules football umpire currently officiating in the Australian Football League.

He first umpired in the Moorabbin Saints Junior Football League in 2006. He has since umpired in a number of leagues, including the TAC Cup, the AFL Victoria Development League, and the Victorian Football League. In the latter two, he officiated in grand finals in 2011 and 2013, respectively. In 2014, he was added to the Australian Football League umpiring list, and made his debut in Round 7 of that year, in a match between Hawthorn and St Kilda at the Melbourne Cricket Ground. He umpired 14 matches in his debut season. He officiated in his 50th AFL game in Round 4, 2017, in Greater Western Sydney's 31-point win over Port Adelaide at Manuka Oval.

References

Living people
Australian Football League umpires
Year of birth missing (living people)